Augerum House is a manor house in Blekinge, Sweden. It is located in Augerum north of Karlskrona. The manor house has two main buildings, the older one built about 1720 by  pharmacist Johan Eberhard Ferber (1678-1761); the newer one, called Stora Hus, in 1810 by Admiral Providence Master Carl Schweber.  In 1855, the property was bought by Chancellor of Justice  Nils von Koch (1801-1881) and his spouse Frances F. Lewin (1804-1888). The estate is still owned by members of their family.

References

Buildings and structures in Blekinge County
Houses completed in 1720
Manor houses in Sweden
1720 establishments in Sweden